Malfejan (also Romanized as Mālfejān and Mālaf Jān; also known as Mālfajāh, Mālfejān-e Bālā, and Murufudzhan) is a village in Malfejan Rural District, in the Central District of Siahkal County, Gilan Province, Iran. At the 2006 census, its population was 992, in 286 families.

References 

Populated places in Siahkal County